John Woodruffe Tilbury (4 January 1931 – 2 August 2020) was a British rower. He competed in the men's coxed four event at the 1960 Summer Olympics.

He also represented England and won a gold medal in the coxless four and a bronze medal in the eights at the 1962 British Empire and Commonwealth Games in Perth, Western Australia.

References

External links
 

1931 births
2020 deaths
British male rowers
Olympic rowers of Great Britain
Rowers at the 1960 Summer Olympics
People from Ashford, Kent
Commonwealth Games medallists in rowing
Rowers at the 1962 British Empire and Commonwealth Games
Commonwealth Games gold medallists for England
Commonwealth Games bronze medallists for England
Medallists at the 1962 British Empire and Commonwealth Games